Albignasego is a comune (municipality) in the Province of Padua in the Italian region Veneto, located about  west of Venice and about  south of Padua.

The municipality of Albignasego contains the main village and frazioni (hamlets) Carpanedo,  Lion, Mandriola, S. Agostino, S. Giacomo.

Albignasego borders the following municipalities: Abano Terme, Maserà di Padova, Casalserugo, Padua, Ponte San Nicolò.

Among the churches in town is San Tommaso Apostolo.

Demographic evolution

Twin towns
Albignasego is twinned with:

  Galanta, Slovakia, since 2007

Religion

Churches
San Tommaso Apostolo

References

External links
 www.comune.albignasego.pd.it/

Cities and towns in Veneto
Articles which contain graphical timelines